Šķirotava Station is a railway station on the Riga – Daugavpils Railway.

References 

Railway stations in Riga
Railway stations opened in 1905
1905 establishments in the Russian Empire